The 1934 Mercer Bears football team  was an American football that represented Mercer University as a member of the Dixie Conference and the Southern Intercollegiate Athletic Association (SIAA) in the 1934 college football season. Led by Lake Russell in his sixth season as head coach, the team comped an overall record of 3–6–1 and with a mark of 0–2–1 in Dixie Conference play and 1–4 against SIAA competition.

Schedule

References

Mercer
Mercer
Mercer Bears football seasons
Mercer Bears football